"Space Age Love Song" is a 1982 single released by the British band A Flock of Seagulls. It was their fourth single. Lead guitarist Paul Reynolds remarked on their 1984 video album Through the Looking Glass that, as the band could not come up with a title for the track, he suggested "Space Age Love Song" because he thought it sounded like a space age love song.  The song reached the top 30 in the UK and the US in June 1982 and February 1983 respectively.

In 2018, a re-recorded version of the song, featuring the Prague Philharmonic Orchestra, was released as a 5-track and 8-track special edition EP. It is the first single from the band's sixth album, Ascension.

A video of the song was produced in 1982 and featured the band miming a performance of the song. The band made another video in 2018 to coincide with the release of Ascension.

Track listing

Chart performance

References

1982 songs
1982 singles
A Flock of Seagulls songs
Jive Records singles
Song recordings produced by Mike Howlett
Teldec singles